Metropolitan State Hospital is the name of
 Metropolitan State Hospital (California)
 Metropolitan State Hospital (Massachusetts)